Lee Hoe-taik (이회택, born 11 October 1946) is a former South Korean football player and manager. He is widely regarded as one of the greatest South Korean forwards of all time. He is also one of four players inducted into the Korean FA Hall of Fame.

Early life
Lee started his youth career late in high school, but showed a fast development. He was selected for the South Korea national team three years after beginning football in earnest. On 10 December 1966, Lee made his senior international debut against Thailand in the 1966 Asian Games.

Club career
Lee joined Yangzee, founded by the Korean Central Intelligence Agency to develop the national team.

In the 1967 Pestabola Merdeka, Lee scored three goals, contributing to team's title.

Yangzee also participated in the 1969 Asian Champion Club Tournament. Lee scored a hat-trick in the first group match against Mysore State. Lee was injured during the third group match against Bangkok Bank, but assisted the winning goal in the next match against Vietnam Police. Yangzee won all of the five matches including the semi-finals before the final, but it lost 1–0 to Israeli club Maccabi Tel Aviv after extra time in the final.

International career
Lee scored three goals in five matches of the 1968 Summer Olympics qualification. South Korea failed to qualify for the Olympics on goal difference, although their points were tied with Japan, the group winners.

In the 1970 FIFA World Cup qualification, Lee showed poor performance and couldn't prevent South Korea's elimination. However, Lee proved his worth again as an important playmaker in the 1969 King's Cup after the failure in the World Cup qualification. He assisted three winning goals against Laos, Malaysia, and Indonesia, leading South Korea to the title.

Lee's performance was continued in the 1970 Pestabola Merdeka. In the group stage, he scored the winning goal against Singapore, and assisted two goals against Indonesia. In the semi-finals and the final, Lee consecutively scored winning goals against India and Burma.

On 5 September 1970, South Korea had a friendly match with Benfica. Lee scored the opener, but the match ended in a 1–1 draw with Eusébio's penalty equaliser.

Lee recorded a goal against Hong Kong and two assists against Malaysia in the 1970 King's Cup, helping South Korea win the competition again.

Lee played for South Korea in the 1970 Asian Games, making the effort to won a major title. He scored the winning goal against Iran in the group stage, and assisted all of South Korea's two goals in the semi-finals against Japan. After defeating its biggest rivals, South Korea shared the gold with Burma by drawing 0–0 in the final. Lee was named the Korean FA Player of the Year as the largest contributor to three Asian titles of the national team in that year.

Lee also participated in the 1972 AFC Asian Cup. Lee scored the winning goal against Khmer Republic in the group stage. In the final against Iran, he assisted the equaliser, but South Korea finally lost 2–1 after extra time.

On 2 June 1972, South Korea had a friendly match with Santos, for which Pelé was playing. Lee scored a goal, but South Korea lost 3–2.

Style of play
Lee was nicknamed the "Leopard" in South Korea due to his innate stamina, rapid pace, and powerful shots. He was also proficient in creating chances, giving many key passes to other forwards  in the middle.

Managerial career 
Lee managed POSCO Atoms from 1987 to 1992 and won two K Leagues. Lee also managed the South Korea national team from 1988 to 1990. He finished the 1988 AFC Asian Cup as a runner-up, and recorded nine wins and two draws without a defeat in the 1990 FIFA World Cup qualification. However, his team lost all three group matches in the 1990 FIFA World Cup, struggling at world-class level.

Career statistics

International
 

Results list South Korea's goal tally first.

Honours

Player 
Yangzee
Korean National Championship: 1968
Korean President's Cup: 1968
Asian Champion Club Tournament runner-up: 1969

POSCO FC
Korean Semi-professional League (Spring): 1975
Korean National Championship runner-up: 1977
Korean President's Cup: 1974

South Korea
Asian Games: 1970
AFC Asian Cup runner-up: 1972

Individual
Korean FA Best XI: 1969, 1970, 1971, 1972, 1974
Korean FA Player of the Year: 1970
Korean President's Cup Best Player: 1974
Korean FA Hall of Fame: 2005

Manager 
Hanyang University
Korean National Championship: 1983

POSCO Atoms
K League 1: 1988, 1992

South Korea
AFC Asian Cup runner-up: 1988

Individual
K League 1 Manager of the Year: 1988, 1992

References

External links
 

1946 births
Living people
People from Gimpo
South Korean footballers
South Korea international footballers
1972 AFC Asian Cup players
Sportspeople from Gyeonggi Province
Pohang Steelers players
Pohang Steelers managers
Jeonnam Dragons managers
South Korean football managers
South Korea national football team managers
1988 AFC Asian Cup managers
1990 FIFA World Cup managers
Asian Games medalists in football
Footballers at the 1966 Asian Games
Footballers at the 1970 Asian Games
Association football forwards
Asian Games gold medalists for South Korea
Medalists at the 1970 Asian Games